Kenneth Lee Ascher (born October 26, 1944 in Washington, D.C.) is an American jazz pianist, composer, and arranger who is active in jazz, rock, classical, and musical theater genres — in live venues, recording studios, and cinema production. With Paul Williams, he wrote the song "Rainbow Connection" for The Muppet Movie. Both Williams and Ascher received Oscar nominations for the 1979 Academy Awards for Best Original Song ("Rainbow Connection") and Best Original Score (The Muppet Movie Soundtrack). The song was also nominated for the Golden Globes for "Best Original Song" that same year.

His work 
Ascher's work through the years has included keyboard parts and string arrangements on John Lennon's albums Mind Games, Walls and Bridges and Rock 'n' Roll and Yoko Ono's A Story, music for several songs from Barbra Streisand's remake of A Star Is Born (where he also served as music coordinator), and arrangements for portions of Jim Steinman and Meat Loaf's masterpiece Bat Out of Hell (produced by Todd Rundgren). Ascher's own rendition of "Rainbow Connection" was featured in the closing credits of The Break-Up (starring Vince Vaughn and Jennifer Aniston).  Ascher is the pianist with the Birdland Big Band, which performs Fridays from 5:15 to 7 at Birdland in New York City. The Birdland Big Band performs "Rainbow Connection", arranged by Lew Anderson.

In the latter 1960s, Ascher played piano and arranged for the Woody Herman Orchestra.  Herman hired Ascher — on the advice of Frank Foster — to replace Nat Pierce, who had departed.  Ascher has been a member of ASCAP since 1968.

Selected compositions 

 Three for the Show, m & arr. Ascher (1960)
 The White Rabbit, music & arr. Ascher (1960)
 Scotch Mist, music & arr. by Ascher (1960)
 Theme for Ken's Men, m & arr. Ascher (1960)
 Retrospect, words & arr. Ascher (1960)
 Typically April: A Revolutionary Musical, lyrics and music by Ascher (1966)
 Stars and Sand (1967)
 Nightling (1967)
 April's in my Lady's Face (1967)
 Colors (1967)
 Dressed Up For a Dream (1967)
 These blues were made for cookin'  (1967)
 Who can hear the nightingale? (1967)
 It seems different to me now (1967)
 Lullaby (1967)
 Last night's rain (1967)
 Laughin' Place (1967)
 Miss Fitz (1967)
 Maybe another spring (1967)
 Funny little girl (1967)
 Concerto for Trombone and Orchestra (1968)
 1968 Baltimore Colts Highlights (ASCAP 1968)
 Music for Orchestra (Master's essay, Columbia University) (1968)
 Bittersweet wild child, words by Donna Lee, music by Ascher (1968)
 Cavettina (1968)
 Silent Partners, words Donna Lee, music Ascher (1968)
 So I told it to the rain, words Donna Lee Levitt (Donna Lee), music by Ascher (1968)
 You can't make this child cry, words Donna Lee Levitt, music by Ascher (1968)
 Here I Go Again, words Donna Lee (Donna Lee Levitt), music by Ascher (1968)
 My memory bank's been robbed, words Donna Lee (Donna Lee Levitt), music by Ascher (1968)
 Leaf in the Wind, words and music by Lon Ritchie & Ascher (1969)
 Omnibus, words & music by Ascher, Donna Lee & Joe Renzetti (1969)
 One for Jim (1970)
 Another Kind of Blues (1970)
 Mosaics : a piece for guitar, string quartet and woodwind quartet with accompanying aesthetic commentary and description (thesis for Columbia University) (1972)
 Inspiration, by Paul Williams, Ascher (1973)
 Bugaloo and Such (1973)
 Play, piper, play, words Donna Lee Levitt, music Ascher (1973)
 Little Bit of Love, words & music by Paul Williams & Ascher (1974)
 Lone Star, words & music by Paul Williams & Ascher (1974)
 Loneliness, words & music Paul Williams & Ascher (1974)
 Nilsson sings Newman, by Paul Williams, Ascher (1974)
 Sad Song, words & music Paul Williams & Ascher (1974)
 Sunday, words & music Paul Williams & Ascher (1974)
 You Know Me, by Paul Williams, Ascher (1974)
 She Sings for Free, words & music by Paul Williams & Ascher (1974, 2002)
 You and Me Against the World, Paul Williams, Ascher (1974)
 Makin' the same mistakes (1974)
 Isn't It Odd? (1974)
 Candlelight Dreamer (1974)
 Bein' a Movie Star (1974)
 Coming Undone (1974)
 With You, words Carole Bayer Sager, music Ascher (1975)
 Don't you worry child, words Carole Bayer Sager, music Ascher (1975)
From the 1976 film, A Star is Born
 "Watch Closely Now", Paul Williams, Ascher
 "Hellacious Acres", Paul Williams, Ascher
 "The Woman in the Moon", Paul Williams, Ascher
 "Finale: With One More Look at You/Watch Closely Now", Paul Williams, Ascher
 Run for life, vocal music by Ascher, lyrics by Albert Lerman (1978)
From the 1979 film, The Muppet Movie
 "Rainbow Connection", words & music by Ascher and Paul Williams (1979)
 "Movin' Right Along", Paul Williams & Ascher (1979)
 "Never Before, Never Again!", – Miss Piggy, Paul Williams & Ascher (1979)
 "Never Before, Never Again!", – Instrumental, Paul Williams & Ascher (1979)
 "I Hope That Somethin' Better Comes Along!", – Kermit and Rowlf, Paul Williams & Ascher (1979)
 "Can You Picture That?", Paul Williams & Ascher (1979)
 "I Hope That Somethin' Better Comes Along!", – Instrumental
 "For Goodness Sake", Paul Williams, Ascher (1979)
 "Finale, the magic store", Paul Williams, Ascher (1979)
 For the Life of Me, Paul Williams, Ascher (1979)
 Making Friends,  Waring & LaRosa; arr. Ascher (1979)
 Gift, Paul Williams, Ascher (1979)
 Little more like you, Paul Williams, Ascher (1979)
 Save me a dream, Paul Williams, Ascher (1979)
 Go Away
 Song for children of all ages, words and music by Ascher
 Kenny's ballad, music by Ascher (1980)
 Perfect Crime, music & lyrics by Ascher & John Barranco (1989)

Selected discography 
As leader

 Kenny Ascher, the Moog Machine, Switched-On Rock (played on Moog by Kenny) Columbia Records (1969)
 Kenny Ascher, Christmas Becomes Electric / The Moog (played on Moog by Kenny) Columbia Records (1970)

As arranger

 Woody Herman and the Thundering Herd, Concerto for Herd (Monterey Jazz Festival), Verve Records (September 17, 1967)
 Woody's Boogaloo, arranged by Ascher
 Paul Williams, Here Comes Inspiration, (LP) (Ascher is producer, conductor, arranger, writer and pianist) A&M Records (1974)
 Airto Moreira, Virgin Land (Salvation, 1974)
 Helen Reddy, No Way To Treat A Lady, Capitol Records (1975)
 B3 – You Know Me, by Ascher and Williams
 Lori Lieberman, Letting Go, RCA Victor, arrangements by Ascher (June 19, 1978)

As sideman or band member, on keyboards

 Howard Tate, Keep Cool (Don't Be a Fool), The Hit Factory (Oct 12, 1971)
 Tom Scott, Smoothin' On Down, Epic/Ode, New York City (July 1971)
 The J.B.s, "Food For Thought" People Records New York, 1971, (Ascher electric piano)
 Patti LaBelle, Moon Shadow (Ascher performs on tracks A3, A4, B2, B4), Warner Bros. Records (1972)
 Yvonne Elliman, Yvonne Elliman, Decca Records (1972)
 Bill Quateman, Bill Quatemen, (Ascher plays keyboards, produced the album, and wrote the string arrangements) CBS Records (1972)
 John Lennon, Mind Games (1973)
 Johnny Hartman, I've Been There (1973)
 Cecil Holmes, Cecil Homes Soulful Sounds, The – Black Motion Picture Experience, Buddah Records (1973)
 Bette Midler, Bette Midler, Atlantic Records (1973)
 Morgana King, New Beginnings, Paramount Records (1973)
 A4 – The Sands of Time and Changes (Ascher, piano)
 B2 – A Song for You (Ascher, piano)
 Mark Murphy, Mark II, Muse Records (1973)
 John Prine, Sweet Revenge, Atlantic Records (1973)
 Carly Simon, Hotcakes, Elektra Records (1974)
 Martha Reeves, Martha Reeves, MCA Records (1974)
 B2 – Sweet Misery (Ascher plays clavinet and organ)   
 Johnny Winter, John Dawson Winter III Columbia Records (1974)
 John Lennon, "Whatever Gets You thru the Night" (single) (Ascher plays clavinet) Apple Records (1974)
 John Lennon, Walls and Bridges (Ascher plays keyboards), Apple Records (1974)
 Paul Williams, A Little Bit of Love, by Ascher & Nice to Be Around, by Williams (Ascher is producer, conductor, arranger, writer and pianist) 45 RMP, Promo (1974)
 Paul Williams, A Little Bit of Love (Ascher is producer, conductor, arranger, writer and pianist), A&M Records (1974)
 A1 – A Little Bit of Love, by Ascher
 A4 – Sunday, by Ascher
 B2 – She Sings for Free, by Ascher
 B5 – Loneliness, by Ascher
 B6 – Sad Song, by Ascher
 James Taylor, Walking Man, Warner Bros. Records (1974)
 Harry Nilsson, Pussy Cats (Ascher: piano, conductor, orchestration), RCA Victor (1974)
 Yoko Ono, Feeling the Space (recorded 1974, released 1997)
 Airto, Virgin Land, Salvation (Feb. 1974)
 B4 – I Don't Have to Do What I Don't Want to Do (Ascher plays melletron on this track)
 Judy Collins, Judith, Elektra Records (1975)
 Merry Clayton, Keep Your Eye on the Sparrow, Ode Records (1975)
 John Lennon, Rock 'n' Roll (Ascher plays keyboards), Capitol Records (1975)
 Paul Simon, Still Crazy After All These Years (Ascher plays organ), Warner Bros. Records (1975)
 Gladys Knight & The Pips, 2nd Anniversary (Ascher plays keyboards) (1975)
 B1 – You and Me Against the World, arr Don Hannah, written by Ascher and Williams
 John Tropea, The Jingle, West Orange, New Jersey, Marlin (1975)
 Frankie Valli, Closeup, Private Stock Records (1975)
 Dr. John, Hollywood Be Thy Name, United Artists Records (1975)
 Nanette Natal, The Beginning, New York, Evolution (date unknown, prob late 1970s)
 Leslie West, The Leslie West Band Phantom Records, distributed by RCA Records, and later, ESP Management Inc. (1975)
 Barbra Streisand and Kris Kristofferson, A Star Is Born (soundtrack), Columbia Records (1976)
 A1 – Watch Closely Now, by Ascher   
 A5 – Hellacious Acres, by Ascher
 B1 – The Woman in the Moon, by Ascher and Williams
 B4 – Finale: With One More Look At You / Watch Closely Now, by Ascher and Williams   
 Paul Williams, Classics, A&M Records (1977)
 A2 – You and Me Against the World, by Ascher and Williams   
 A4 – Loneliness, by Ascher and Williams
 B2 – With One More Look at You, by Ascher and Williams
 (Ascher produced tracks: A2, A4, B4, B5)
 Phoebe Snow, Never Letting Go, Columbia Records (Ascher performs on keyboards and orchestrates on selections) (1977)
 Frankie Valli, Lady Put the Light Out, Private Stock Records (1977)
 Meat Loaf, Bat Out of Hell, Epic Records (1977) (RIAA 14xPlatinum Certified)
 A3 – Heaven Can Wait (string arrangement by Ascher)
 B1 – Two Out of Three Ain't Bad (string arrangement by Ascher)
 Tom Scott, Blow It Out, Ode Records (1977)
 A2 – Smoothin' On Down (Ascher plays clavinet on this track)
 Maynard Ferguson, Conquistador, Columbia Records (1977)
 The Muppets, Movin' Right Along, (45 RPM) CBS Records Australia (1979)
 The Muppets, The Muppet Movie Original Soundtrack Recording (Ascher co-writes, co-arranges, and performs on keyboards), Columbia Records (1979)
 Perry Como, Perry Como, RCA Victor (1980)
 Earl Klugh, Late Night Guitar
 Yoko Ono, Walking On Thin Ice (45 RPM), Geffen Records (1981)
 B – It Happened (Ascher, keyboards on the flipside only)  
 Marvin Stamm, Stammpede, New York, Palo Alto (1983)
 Peter Dean, Radio, Inner City Records, New York (1984)
 Pat Williams' New York Band, 10th Avenue, New York, Soundwings (Dec. 1986)
 Warren Bernhardt, Hands On (Kenny performs on the 2nd and 4th works) (CD) (1987)
 Dr. John, Mos' Scocious: The Dr. John Anthology, Rhino Records (1993)
 2-15 – Back by the River (Ascher plays keyboard)
 David Matthews Orchestra, Furuhata Jazz in N.Y., New York, WEA (Japan) (1997)
 The Wiz (Original Soundtrack), MCA Records (1997)
 Gary LeMel, Moonlighting (Ascher is assistant conductor), Skylark Atlantic 83178-2 (1998)
 Alex Donner, White Tie, New York & Astoria, Black Tie Records (Mar 10, 1998-Sep 8, 2000)
 Patti LaBelle, Labelle, Wounded Bird Records (2000)
 1 – Morning Much Better, Ascher – piano
 6 – Running Out of Fools – If You Gotta Make a Fool of Somebody, Ascher – piano
 10 – Time, Ascher – piano
 11 – When the Sun Comes Shining Through (The Ladder), Ascher – piano
 Wally Dunbar, Everything in Time, Nardis Consolidated Artists CAP953 (2000)
 Nelson Foltz, The Longing Hours, New York & Northvale, N.J., Syberdelix (2001)
 Jane Monheit, In the Sun, New York, N Coded Music (March–June 2002)
 Jane Monheit, Live at the Rainbow Room, N Coded Music (September 23, 2002)
 Scott Whitfield Jazz Orchestra East, Live at "Birdland", Summit Records (March 10, 2003)
 Clay Aiken, Merry Christmas with Love, RCA Records (2004)
 Susan Robkin, Surfacing to Breathe (May 2004)
 Don Payne (bass), Rhapsodic Echoes, (Ascher plays piano on tracks 5 & 8) Recycled Notes Music Company (May 5, 2004)
 5 – Unscheduled Departures
 8 – M.A.P.S. (Bob Mann, Kenny Ascher, Don Payne, Allen Schwartzberg)
 Scott Whitfield, Diamonds for Nat, New York, Summit Records (April 12 & 13, 2005)
 Rod Stewart, Thanks for the Memory: The Great American Songbook, Volume IV, J-Records (Oct. 18, 2005)
 Steve Tyrell, The Disney Standards, Walt Disney Records (2006)
 10 – When She Loved Me (Ascher, keyboards)
 14 – Baby Mine, (Ascher, keyboards & string arrangements)
 Steve Tyrell, Back to Bacharach, Koch Records (2008)
 4 – One Less Bell to Answer (piano, Ascher; arr Bacharach; strings arr, Ascher)
 11 – Close to You (Ascher, piano)
 12 – A House is Not a Home (Ascher, piano)
 The Birdland Big Band, The Lew Anderson Tribute Concert (live), I.E.G. Inc. (June 1, 2007)
 Tommy Igoe and the Birdland Big Band, Live from New York (DVD) I.E.G. Inc. (Jan 1, 2009) 
)
 Andy Farber and His Orchestra, This Could be the Start of Something Big (2009)
 Tommy Igoe and the Birdland Big Band, Eleven (11-11-11)
 Ron Sunshine "Bring It Home" Rondette Jazz (November 20, 2015) Ascher piano.

Awards & award nominations 
Awards

 1976 — Golden Globe for Best Original Score, A Star is Born, 34th Golden Globe Awards, Kenny Ascher & Paul Williams

Nominations
 1978 — Anthony Asquith Award nomination for Film Music, A Star is Born, British Academy of Film and Television Arts, Kenny Ascher
 1979 — Golden Globe nomination for Best Original Song, Rainbow Connection, 37th Golden Globe Awards, Kenny Ascher & Paul Williams
 1979 — Academy Award nomination for Best Original Song Score and Its Adaptation or Adaptation Score, The Muppet Movie, 52nd Academy Awards, Kenny Ascher & Paul Williams
 1979 — Academy Award nomination for Best Original Song, The Muppet Movie, 52nd Academy Awards, Kenny Ascher & Paul Williams

Critically acclaimed live performances 
 Feb 1973 — Ascher played piano with Marvin Stamm at Sam's Jazz Upstairs (1220 2nd Avenue at 64th St., New York City): Bob Dougherty (bass) and Ronnie Zito on drums.  Stamm said, "In 21 years of playing music, this is the best group of musicians I've ever been with."  Reflecting on that statement, John Stuart Wilson (1913–2002), longtime jazz critic for The New York Times, said, "That might have sounded like a fatuous statement leaders often make in introducing their musicians to a jazz club audience.  In this case, however, it was completely believable because Mr. Stamm's quartet is the most exciting group that has turned-up in New York for a long time."
 May 1973 — Kenny Ascher Trio, Sundays, Jimmy Weston's, 131 E 54th St., New York City
 Jan 13, 2009 — Mike Berkowitz and The New Gene Krupa Orchestra, Iridium
 Dec 2000 — Michael Feinstein with a small swing band led by Kenny Ascher, the Regency, New York City
 July 2001 — Jay Leonhart with Kenny Ascher and Michael Leonhart, July 13–21, Oak Room of the Algonquin Hotel

Jingle writing 
Ascher has composed (or co-composed) jingles for:

 The 1968 Baltimore Colts
 Federal Express
 Applause
 Gotcha
 Larry
 Mr. Calm
 Heineken
The Beer
Combined
 General Electric
 Brilliant Idea/ GE Brings Good Things to Life
 Cooking
 Pizza Hut (Class Act)
 NFL
 Campbell's Soup – Never Underestimate the Power of Soup campaign
 Never Underestimate
 Canned Chef
 Hockey
 Makes Itself
 Red Dress
 Snowman
 Stay Young
 Storm Radio – Winter
 Superhero
 Superman
 Tennis Anyone?
 Wild Ride
 Frigidaire (Nightfeeding)
 Diet Pepsi (Uh-Huh Blues – You've Got The Right One, Baby, with Ray Charles) American Dairy (Warm All Over) Coors Brewing Company
 Herman Joseph – Polo, revised arr by Kenny Ascher (1981)
 Herman Joseph – Tennis, comp. & arr. by Kenny Ascher (1981)
 Sailboat music and arr. by Kenneth Ascher (1980)
 Billiards, music and arr. by Kenneth Ascher (1980)
 National Airlines (Generic/scope), music by Ken Ascher (1978)
 Ford Motors (National Test Drive)

Many of Ascher's jingle compositions were (i) produced by Sunday Productions (Hilary Jay Lipsitz, born 1933, president), (ii) published by Ahoskie Music, Inc. (Hilary Jay Lipsitz, president), and (iii) licensed by ASCAP.

Academic education 
Ascher holds three diplomas from Columbia University:

 1966 — Bachelor of Arts (music composition), Columbia College, Columbia University
 1968 — Master of Arts (music composition), Graduate School of Arts & Sciences, Columbia University
 1971 — Doctor of Musical Arts (music composition), School of the Arts, Columbia University

While at Columbia, Ascher studied composition with Otto Luening, Jack Beeson, and Vladimir Ussachevsky and piano with William Albert Beller (1900–1986).  Ascher graduated from William F. Dykes High School in Atlanta, as valedictorian, and entered Columbia College, Columbia University on a math scholarship.  In 1966, while in college, the Kenny Ascher Quintet performed live in WKCR's Stone Soup at midnight.

References 

American jazz pianists
Post-bop pianists
Big band pianists
American film score composers
American male film score composers
American jazz composers
American male jazz composers
American rock pianists
American male pianists
American organists
American session musicians
Golden Globe Award-winning musicians
20th-century American keyboardists
Musicians from New York (state)
Musicians from Washington, D.C.
Songwriters from New York (state)
Songwriters from Washington, D.C.
Living people
1944 births
Columbia University School of the Arts alumni
Plastic Ono Band members
ASCAP composers and authors
20th-century American pianists
Columbia College (New York) alumni
Columbia Graduate School of Arts and Sciences alumni